The tetradecathlon is a 14-event form of athletics. The International Association for Ultra Multievents (IAUM) is in charge of it and runs the World Championships for it alongside the Icosathlon. The event is also called the double heptathlon. There is an indoor variant for men and women as well as a one-day variant. (The tetradecathlon is only for women).

Events 

Day one

100m hurdles
High jump
1500m
400m hurdles
Shot put
200m

Day two
100m
Long jump
400m
Javelin
800m
200m hurdles
Discus
3000m

World Championships (outdoor)

National Records

Area Records

Indoor tetradecathlon 
The indoor tetradecathlon is a double heptathlon which takes place in an indoor athletics arena. Also run by the IAUM, its world championship is held yearly starting in 2012.

Events (indoors)
Day 1

60m

Long jump

800m

Shot

400m

High jump

Day 2

3000m

60m hurdles

Pole vault

1500m

Weight throw

200m

Triple jump

5000m

World Champions (indoor) 
2012 women = Laura Mantyla

2014 women = Matleena Helander

2016 women = Maren Schott

2018 women = Linda Holmström

2022 women = Amanda Pasko

2012 men = Etienne Bouden

2014 men = Joey Blangé

2016 men = Andreas Schewalje

2018 men = Sébastien Biau

2022 men = Baptiste Scalabrino

Other IAUM events 
Icosathlon

References
 Double decathlon and double heptathlon in Delft, the Netherlands
 One day double decathlon and double heptathlon in Heiloo, the Netherlands

External links
 International Association for Ultra Multievents (IAUM)

Events in track and field
Combined track and field events
Endurance games
Individual sports